Beatriz Pichi Malen (born 22 April 1953), the stage name of Norma Beatriz Berretta, is an Argentine singer of Mapuche origin. Her artistic work is related to the search, rescue and dissemination of the Mapuche culture. She has performed in different stages of the world singing in Mapudungun.

Her artistic career began around 1990, when she was invited by the Rockefeller Foundation to participate in the IV International Women's Congress in Manhattan.

First she was married to a Spanish Galician, and then, approximately in 1986, she remarried Quechua Lucho Cruz, with whom she had a daughter named Wychariy.

Discography 
 2000 - Plata
 2005 - Añil
 2015 - Mapuche
 Cuatro mujeres

Collaborations 
 Me mata la vida (de La Portuaria)

References

External links 
 Beatriz Pichi Malen on Last.fm

1953 births
Living people
People from Buenos Aires Province
Argentine people of Mapuche descent
20th-century Argentine women singers
Argentine folk singers
21st-century Argentine women singers
Mapuche singers
Mapuche women